This is a list of notable British people of Italian ancestry and of Italians established in the UK.  The citizenship and connection to the United Kingdom and Italy is shown in parentheses.

Administration

Prime ministers
Benjamin Disraeli

Secretaries of state and ministers
A. J. Mundella
John Profumo
John Sperni Mayor of St Pancras, 1937-1938

Arts

Cartoonists
Edward Ardizzone
Barry Fantoni

Circus performers
Emilia Arata
Charlie Cairoli
Joseph Grimaldi

Composers
Muzio Clementi
Maria Cosway
Gerald Finzi
Felice Giardini
Remo Lauricella
John Marcangelo

Designers
John Amabile
John Galliano

Education
Anna Hassan

Film directors
Ginevra Elkann

Hairdressers
Lino Carbosiero
Anthony Mascolo

Journalists
Lucrezia Millarini

Librarians
Anthony Panizzi

Literature
John Florio (1553–1625), known in Italian as Giovanni Florio; linguist and lexicographer of Anglo-Italian origin; referred to himself as 'an Englishman in Italiano'; royal language tutor at the Court of James I; a friend with huge influence on William Shakespeare
Michelangelo Florio (1515–1572), Italian humanist; Franciscan friar before converting to Protestantism; pastor in England and Switzerland; father of the renaissance polymath John Florio

Musicians

Perry Bamonte
Richard Barbieri
John Barbirolli
Anthony Bassano
Nicola Benedetti
Anna Calvi
Junior Campbell
Jim Capaldi
Paul Coletti
Maria Cosway
Robert Del Naja
Mike Di Scala
Sophia Dussek
Lita Ford
Felice Giardini
Tony Iommi
Remo Lauricella
Nicolas Mori
Vincent Novello
Paolo Nutini
Pino Palladino
Antonio Pappano
Anthony Pini
Sergio Pizzorno
Andrea Prodan
Chris Rea
Andrew Ridgely
Atticus Ross
Liberty Ross
Francis Rossi
Semprini
Tom Zanetti

Painters

Giovanni Battista Cipriani
Emilio Coia
Maria Cosway
John Marcangelo
Alberto Morrocco
Eduardo Paolozzi
Carlo Pellegrini
Dante Gabriel Rossetti
Alexander Rossi
Jack Vettriano
Andrew Vicari

Photographers
Alexander Bassano
Felice Beato
Oscar Marzaroli
Mario Testino
Minnie Weisz

Poets
Emilia Lanier
Mario Petrucci
Christina Rossetti
Dante Gabriel Rossetti

Scriptwriters
Emilia di Girolamo
Dominic Minghella

Sculptors
Eduardo Paolozzi

Singers
Lewis Capaldi
Frankie Cocozza
Paul Di'Anno
Sophia Dussek
Brian Johnson
Leona Lewis
Luciana
Lisa Maffia
Linda Martin
Christina Novelli
Paolo Nutini
Julian Perretta
Sergio Pizzorno
Andrea Prodan
Chris Rea
Francis Rossi
Jack Savoretti
Sharleen Spiteri
Lena Zavaroni
Thaila Zucchi

Opera singers
Louisa Bassano
Domenico Crivelli
Clara Novello
Nancy Storace

Translators
Dante Gabriel Rossetti

Writers
Harold Acton
Jani Allan
Isaac D'Israeli
Armando Iannucci
Nigel Pivaro
John William Polidori
David Profumo
Christina Georgina Rossetti
Dante Gabriel Rossetti
Maria Francesca Rossetti
William Michael Rossetti
Rafael Sabatini
Alexander Trocchi
Giustiniana Wynne

Crime

Fraudsters
Giovanni di Stefano

Mobsters
Messina Brothers
Bert 'Battles' Rossi
Charles 'Darby' Sabini
Albert Dimes
The Cortesi brothers
Tony Mella 'The king of Soho' during the 1950s.

Economics

Entrepreneurs
Charles Forte, emigrated from Italy
Alex Polizzi, hotelier

Food and drink

Celebrity chefs
Antonio Carluccio
Gennaro Contaldo
Gino D'Acampo
Anna Del Conte
Angela Hartnett
Giorgio Locatelli
Filippo Mazzei
Marco Pierre White
Aldo Zilli

Media and performing arts

Actors
Philip Arditti
Peter Capaldi
Hugh Carson
Daniel Caltagirone
Enzo Cilenti
Jason Connery
Tom Conti
Michael Costa
Sean Cronin
Cameron Cuffe
Timothy Dalton
Fabien Frankel
Michael Greco
Jack Huston
Lupino Lane
Christopher Lee
Ray Lovelock
John Lynch
Michael Malarkey
Max Minghella
Nico Mirallegro
Alfred Molina
Vincenzo Nicoli
Cliff Parisi
Luke Pasqualino
Adrian Paul
Nigel Pivaro
Robert Rietti
George Rossi
Carlo Rota
Victor Spinetti
Enzo Squillino Jnr
Ken Stott
Mark Strong
Joe Tracini

Actresses
Ronni Ancona
Marina Berti
Esmé Bianco
Emily Bruni
Eliza Butterworth
Alessandra Celi
Raffiella Chapman
Flaminia Cinque
Camille Coduri
Nina Conti
Adrienne Corri
Sophia Di Martino
Paola Dionisotti
Giovanna Fletcher
Claire Forlani
Anna Francolini
Holliday Grainger
Louise Lombard
Montserrat Lombard
Cherie Lunghi
Nathalie Lunghi
Ida Lupino
Linda Lusardi
Susan Lynch
Silvana Mangano
Daniela Nardini
Tamzin Outhwaite
Isabella Pappas
Gloria Paul
Liberty Ross
Camilla and Rebecca Rosso
Greta Scacchi
Gia Scala
Kaya Scodelario
Indira Varma
Lucia Elizabeth Vestris
Rachel Weisz
Thaila Zucchi

Comedians
Ronni Ancona
Nina Conti
Armando Iannucci
Joe Pasquale
Victor Spinetti

Conductors
John Barbirolli
Mantovani
Nicolas Mori
Antonio Pappano

Dancers and choreographers
Flavia Cacace
Graziano Di Prima
Giovanni Pernice
Vincent Simone
Bruno Tonioli

Directors
Josh Appignanesi
Peter Capaldi
Peter Cattaneo
Ida Lupino
Anthony Minghella
Carlo Gabriel Nero
Annalisa Piras

TV personalities
Mario Falcone
Ricci Guarnaccio
Katie Price
Paul Torrisi

TV presenters
Luisa Baldini
Katie Boyle
Paul Coia
Chris Crudelli
Gino D'Acampo
Romana D'Annunzio
Karin Giannone
Lucrezia Millarini
Thalia Pellegrini
Carla Romano
Louis Theroux

Radio presenters
Nick Ferrari
Paul Gambaccini

Internet personalities
Marzia Kjellberg
PJ Liguori
Claude Callegari
Mark Goldbridge

Military

Soldiers
Dennis Donnini

Nobility

People linked to royalty
John Dalberg-Acton, 1st Baron Acton
Peter II, Count of Savoy
David Rizzio
Mary of Modena
Edoardo Mapelli Mozzi

Politics and law

Legal professionals
Joseph Beltrami
Albert Profumo
John Woodcock

Police
Jerome Caminada

Politicians
Tonia Antoniazzi
David Bellotti
Roger Casale
Gloria de Piero
Benjamin Disraeli
Linda Fabiani
Marco Longhi
Ernesto Nathan
James Tennant Molteno
John Charles Molteno
A. J. Mundella
John Profumo
Carla Thorneycroft, Baroness Thorneycroft

Religion

Ecclesial figures

Charles Januarius Acton
Abdo Mitwally
Anselm of Canterbury
Augustine of Canterbury
John Marco Allegro
Boniface of Savoy, Archbishop of Canterbury
Mario Conti
Moses Montefiore
Philip Tartaglia

Science and engineering

Engineers
Sebastian Ziani de Ferranti
Guglielmo Marconi

Inventors
Nick D'Aloisio
Dino Dini
Guglielmo Marconi

Scientists
Henry Peter Bayon
Nicole Soranzo
Joseph Whitaker

Sport

Athletics
Toni Minichiello
Andrew Pozzi

Basketballers
Carlton Myers

Boxers
Frank Buglioni
Enzo Calzaghe
Joe Calzaghe
Anthony Crolla
Enzo Maccarinelli

Cricketers
Damian Crowley
Tony Palladino

Cyclists - road-racing
Dario Cioni
Max Sciandri

Divers
Andrea Spendolini-Sirieix

Footballers
Marco Adaggio
Joe Bacuzzi
Ryan Baldacchino
Marcus Bettinelli
Peter Bonetti
Martin Buglione
Danny Cadamarteri
Alex Campana
John Capaldi
Tony Capaldi
Tony Cascarino
Mike Cecere
Mark DeBolla
Danny Dichio
Tony Dorigo
Mark Falco
Joe Fascione
Lil Fuccillo
Marco Gabbiadini
Giulio Giuricich
Dario Gradi
Giuliano Grazioli
Lou Macari
Giuliano Maiorana
Tony Marchi
Peter Marinello
Dominic Matteo
Piero Mingoia
Giovanni Moscardini
Daniel Nardiello
Danilo Orsi-Dadomo
Tom Parrinello
Simone Perrotta
Danny Racchi
Adriano Rigoglioso
Robert Rosario
Alessia Russo
Antoni Šarčević
Carlo Sartori
Ricky Sbragia
Riccardo Scimeca
Tom Sermanni
Harry Toffolo
Paolo Vernazza
Peter Vincenti
Giuseppe Wilson

Gymnastics
Claudia Fragapane

Motor racing drivers
Paul di Resta
Dario Franchitti
Marino Franchitti
Dario Resta
Roy Salvadori
Dino Zamparelli

Racehorse jockeys

Frankie Dettori

Rugby players

Tommaso Allan
George Biagi
Danny Cipriani
Alex Corbisiero 
Lawrence Dallaglio
Simon Danielli
Nick De Luca
Marcus Di Rollo
Chris Fusaro
Richard Lepori
Dominic Manfredi
Kane Palma-Newport
Jake Polledri
James Saltonstall
Peter Sidoli
Robert Sidoli
Warren Spragg
Marko Stanojevic

Others
Thomas John Barnardo
Julian Baggini
Lucy Evangelista
Peter Falconio
Elizabeth Maria Molteno
Richard Rogers

See also
Immigration to the United Kingdom
Italian Briton
Italian diaspora
Italian people
List of Italian Americans

References

External links
Accademia Apulia UK

 
Italian
Italian Britons